The Military Division (abbreviated to DM) was a Vichy French infantry formation in 1940-1942, during World War II. The divisions were numbered according to the military regions. The Vichy French Military Division had a near-identical organisation as the French Infantry Divisions of 1939-1940, but with the restrictions of the Armistice of 22 June 1940 imposed them.

Organisation 
The table below shows the order of battle that a Military Division aspired to.

Moreover, there existed four cavalry regiments of the general reserve.

Equipment 
This Armistice banned anti-tank and gas protection equipment, while minimizing mechanization. However, the reduction of the French army meant that its remains could be entirely equipped with the newest and best equipment available, e.g. MAS-36 rifle, MAS-38 and Thompson submachine guns. The previously used VB rifle grenade was over time replaced with the Lance Grenades de 50 mm modèle 37. Artillery was only allowed to have 75mm calibre guns.

Military Divisions

References

Notes

Footnotes

Sources 

 
 

Military units and formations disestablished in 1942
Military units and formations established in 1940
Divisions of Vichy France